

Africa 
Algeria
Municipalities of Algeria
Angola
Municipalities of Angola
Benin
Communes of Benin
Burundi
Communes of Burundi
Cape Verde
Municipalities of Cape Verde
Cameroon
List of municipalities in Cameroon
Djibouti
Districts of Djibouti
Equatorial Guinea
Municipalities of Equatorial Guinea
Ivory Coast
Communes of Ivory Coast
Lesotho
Community councils of Lesotho
Libya
Municipalities of Libya
Morocco
List of municipalities, communes, and arrondissements of Morocco
Mozambique
Municipalities of Mozambique
Namibia
Municipalities of Namibia
Niger
Communes of Niger
Nigeria
Local government areas of Nigeria
Rwanda
Districts of Rwanda
São Tomé and Príncipe
Municipalities of São Tomé and Príncipe
Senegal
Communes of Senegal
Sierra Leone
Districts of Sierra Leone
Somalia
Districts of Somalia
South Africa
Municipalities of South Africa
Tunisia
Municipalities of Tunisia
Zambia
Municipalities of Zambia
Zimbabwe
Municipalities of Zimbabwe

Asia 
Armenia
Municipalities of Armenia
Azerbaijan
Municipalities of Azerbaijan
Bahrain
Municipalities of Bahrain
Bangladesh
Municipalities of Bangladesh
Bhutan
Gewogs of Bhutan
Brunei
Municipalities of Brunei
Cambodia
List of districts, municipalities and sections in Cambodia
China
Townships of China
Districts of Hong Kong
Municipalities and parishes of Macau
East Timor
Municipalities of East Timor
Georgia
Lists of municipalities of Georgia
India
Municipalities of India
Indonesia
Municipalities of Indonesia
Japan
Municipalities of Japan
Lebanon
List of municipalities of Lebanon
Malaysia
Municipalities of Malaysia
Myanmar
Townships of Myanmar
Nepal
Municipalities of Nepal
North Korea
Municipalities of North Korea
Philippines
Municipalities of the Philippines
Qatar
Municipalities of Qatar
Saudi Arabia
Municipalities of Saudi Arabia
South Korea
Municipalities of South Korea
Sri Lanka
Municipal councils of Sri Lanka
Taiwan
Townships of Taiwan
Tajikistan
Municipalities of Tajikistan
Thailand
List of municipalities in Thailand
United Arab Emirates
Emirates of the United Arab Emirates
Vietnam
Municipalities of Vietnam

Australia/Oceania 
Australia
Municipalities of Australia
Fiji
Municipalities of Fiji
Kiribati 
Municipalities of Kiribati
Marshall Islands
Municipalities of the Marshall Islands
Micronesia
Municipalities of Micronesia
Nauru
Municipalities of Nauru
New Zealand
Municipalities of New Zealand
Palau
Municipalities of Palau
Papua New Guinea
Municipalities of Papua New Guinea
Samoa
Municipalities of Samoa
Solomon Islands
Municipalities of the Solomon Islands
Tonga
Municipalities of Tonga
Tuvalu
Municipalities of Tuvalu
Vanuatu
Municipalities of Vanuatu

Europe 
Albania
Municipalities of Albania
Andorra
Parishes of Andorra
Austria
Municipalities of Austria
Belarus
Municipalities of Belarus
Belgium
Municipalities of Belgium
Bosnia and Herzegovina
Municipalities of Bosnia and Herzegovina
Bulgaria
Municipalities of Bulgaria
Croatia
Municipalities of Croatia
Cyprus
Municipalities of Cyprus
Czech Republic
List of municipalities in the Czech Republic
Denmark
Municipalities of Denmark
Municipalities of the Faroe Islands
Municipalities of Greenland
Estonia
List of municipalities of Estonia
Finland
List of Finnish municipalities
France
Lists of communes of France
Germany
Municipalities of Germany
Greece
Municipalities of Greece
Hungary
Municipalities of Hungary
Iceland
Municipalities of Iceland
Ireland
Municipalities of Ireland
Italy
List of municipalities of Italy
Latvia
Municipalities of Latvia
Liechtenstein
Municipalities of Liechtenstein
Lithuania
Municipalities of Lithuania
Luxembourg
Municipalities of Luxembourg
Malta
Local councils of Malta
Moldova
Communes of Moldova
Monaco
Municipality of Monaco
Montenegro
Municipalities of Montenegro
Netherlands
Municipalities of the Netherlands
North Macedonia
Municipalities of North Macedonia
Norway
Municipalities of Norway
Poland
List of Polish gminas
Portugal
List of municipalities of Portugal
Romania
Communes of Romania
Russia
Municipalities of Russia
San Marino
Municipalities of San Marino
Serbia
Municipalities of Serbia
Slovakia
Municipalities of Slovakia
Slovenia
Municipalities of Slovenia
Spain
List of municipalities in Spain
Sweden
Municipalities of Sweden
Switzerland
List of municipalities of Switzerland
Turkey
Municipalities of Turkey
Ukraine
List of hromadas of Ukraine
United Kingdom
Municipalities of the United Kingdom
Vatican City
Vatican City

North America 

Antigua and Barbuda
List of settlements in Antigua and Barbuda

The Bahamas
List of cities in the Bahamas

Barbados
List of cities, towns and villages in Barbados

Belize
List of municipalities in Belize

Canada
Lists of municipalities in Canada
List of municipalities in Alberta
List of municipalities in British Columbia
List of municipalities in Manitoba
List of municipalities in New Brunswick
List of municipalities in Newfoundland and Labrador
List of municipalities in the Northwest Territories
List of municipalities in Nova Scotia
List of municipalities in Nunavut
List of municipalities in Ontario
List of municipalities in Prince Edward Island
List of municipalities in Quebec
List of municipalities in Saskatchewan
List of municipalities in Yukon

Costa Rica
Districts of Costa Rica

Cuba
Municipalities of Cuba

Dominica
List of towns and villages in Dominica

Dominican Republic
List of municipalities of the Dominican Republic

El Salvador
List of municipalities of El Salvador

Grenada
List of cities in Grenada

Guatemala
Municipalities of Guatemala

Haiti
List of communes of Haiti

Honduras
Municipalities of Honduras

Jamaica
List of cities and towns in Jamaica

Mexico
Municipalities of Mexico

Nicaragua
Municipalities of Nicaragua

Panama
Districts of Panama

Saint Kitts and Nevis
List of cities and towns in Saint Kitts and Nevis

Saint Lucia
List of cities in Saint Lucia

Saint Vincent and the Grenadines
List of cities, towns and villages in Saint Vincent and the Grenadines

Trinidad and Tobago
Municipalities of Trinidad and Tobago

United States
List of municipalities in Alabama
List of municipalities in Alaska
List of municipalities in Arizona
List of municipalities in Arkansas 
List of municipalities in California
List of municipalities in Colorado
List of municipalities in Connecticut 
List of municipalities in Delaware
List of municipalities in Florida
List of municipalities in Georgia
List of municipalities in Hawaii
List of municipalities in Idaho
List of municipalities in Illinois 
List of municipalities in Indiana
List of municipalities in Iowa
List of municipalities in Kansas
List of municipalities in Kentucky
List of municipalities in Louisiana
List of municipalities in Maine
List of municipalities in Maryland
List of municipalities in Massachusetts
List of municipalities in Michigan
List of municipalities in Minnesota
List of municipalities in Mississippi
List of municipalities in Missouri
List of municipalities in Montana
List of municipalities in Nebraska
List of municipalities in Nevada
List of municipalities in New Hampshire
List of municipalities in New Jersey
List of municipalities in New Mexico
List of municipalities in New York
List of municipalities in North Carolina
List of municipalities in North Dakota
List of municipalities in Ohio
List of municipalities in Oklahoma
List of municipalities in Oregon
List of municipalities in Pennsylvania
List of municipalities in Rhode Island
List of municipalities in South Carolina
List of municipalities in South Dakota
List of municipalities in Tennessee
List of municipalities in Texas
List of municipalities in Utah
List of municipalities in Vermont
List of municipalities in Virginia
List of municipalities in Washington
List of municipalities in West Virginia
List of municipalities in Wisconsin
List of municipalities in Wyoming
List of municipalities in American Samoa
List of municipalities in Guam
List of municipalities in Northern Mariana Islands
List of municipalities in Puerto Rico
List of municipalities in United States Virgin Islands

South America 
Argentina
Municipalities of Argentina
Bolivia
Municipalities of Bolivia
Brazil
Municipalities of Brazil
Chile
Municipalities of Chile
Colombia
Municipalities of Colombia
Ecuador
Municipalities of Ecuador
Guyana
Municipalities of Guyana
Paraguay
Municipalities of Paraguay
Peru
Municipalities of Peru
Suriname
Municipalities of Suriname
Uruguay
Municipalities of Uruguay
Venezuela
Municipalities of Venezuela

See also